Sick Girl is a 2008 American independent horror film written and directed by Eben McGarr.

Sick Girl marks the return of Stephen Geoffreys to the horror genre after a 17-year absence.

Plot
Izzy is a troubled teenage girl who decides to attack and murder her little brother's bullies utilizing skills taught to her by her older brother Rusty, who is away in the Marines. She both lusts after and idolizes Rusty to the point where she overlooks signs that he is anything but perfect, such as his failure to call his family and reconnect.

After causing a massacre on the school bus, Izzy manages to trap and imprison a couple of the bullies in the trunk of her car, showing no remorse or compassion when one of them begs to be set free. She also kidnaps three additional bullies and goads one of them, Tommy, into killing the other two. He succeeds in killing one but is unable to kill the second. Izzy finishes the second bully off and imprisons Tommy with the two surviving bullies she had in the trunk. She takes them to the barn by her home and torments them further before going inside to open Christmas presents with her little brother Kevin and Barney. Izzy gifts Kevin a gun taken from one of the bullies, which concerns Barney.

The deaths on the school bus are reported on the news and are believed to be the work of the missing bullies. Izzy has a flashback to her being angry at Rusty's girlfriend for kissing him goodbye before leaving to join the Marines.  Enraged by this memory, Izzy goes over to her house and murders her.  Deciding to get rid of the remaining bullies, Izzy brutalizes them but is caught by Barney, who she then kills as well. She's surprised to discover that Kevin had come into the barn as well and witnessed the murders. Izzy tries to explain and calm Kevin, but is unsuccessful. Horrified by what she's done, he goes into the house and commits suicide by shooting himself in the head.

In a flashback to an undetermined previous time, two Marines go to her house. Although there is no sound in this scene, it's obvious they are there to tell her that Rusty died in the war. She lashes out at them, and the movie ends as it cuts back to the present to show Izzy walking away from the burning barn.

Cast
Leslie Andrews as Izzy
Charlie Trepany as Kevin
John P. McGarr as Barney
Katherine Macanufo as Stephanie Wallace
Graham Denman as Michael Doyle
Stephen Geoffreys as Mr. Putski
Ian Villalobos as Tommy McGowan
Andy Ignore as Jugs
Justin Marco as Corey Chapman
Peter Partida Jr. as Rudy Browning
Chris W King as Rusty
Caerly Hill as Rusty's Girlfriend

Release 
Sick Girl was given a screening at the Vista Theater in Los Angeles, California on August 16, 2008, as well at the Phoenix Fear Film Festival.

Soundtrack 

 "Family Tree" by Dennis Versteeg and Aaron Moreland 
 "Gary The Goat" by Dennis Versteeg and Eben McGarr 
 "So F*cked Up" and "I Want'em Dead" by Sloppy Seconds 
 "Sunday Morning Letter" and "Caribbean Love Song" by Patrick Sellars

Reception
Sick Girl received reviews from Ginger Nuts of Horror and Dread Central, the latter of which gave the film 3 out of 5 blades and wrote that "You’ll spend a lot of time waiting for the next horrific thing to happen, but when it does you’ll likely feel it was worth the wait." DVD Talk also reviewed Sick Girl, stating "Devastating and seriously messed-up, Sick Girl brings life back to the horror genre just in the nick of time." HorrorNews.net noted that the movie was "Creative…cold and brutal".

Awards
 Phoenix Fear Film Festival Best feature: 2008

References

External links

2007 horror films
2007 films
American independent films
American horror films
2000s crime drama films
American serial killer films
2000s exploitation films
Incest in film
American crime drama films
2000s serial killer films
2007 independent films
2007 drama films
2000s English-language films
2000s American films